|}

The Prix Rothschild is a Group 1 flat horse race in France open to thoroughbred fillies and mares aged three years or older. It is run at Deauville over a distance of 1,600 metres (about 1 mile), and it is scheduled to take place each year in late July or early August.

History
The event was established in 1929, and it was originally called the Prix d'Astarté. It was named after Astarte, a goddess of fertility.

Deauville Racecourse was closed during World War II, and the Prix d'Astarté was not run in 1940. For the remainder of this period it was switched between Longchamp (1941–42, 1944–45) and Le Tremblay (1943).

The present system of race grading was introduced in 1971, and the Prix d'Astarté was initially given Group 3 status. It was promoted to Group 2 level in 1982, and to Group 1 in 2004.

The race was renamed the Prix Rothschild in 2008. This was in memory of Guy de Rothschild (1909–2007), a prominent owner-breeder, and it was an acknowledgement of his family's contribution to French racing.

Records
Most successful horse (4 wins):
 Goldikova – 2008, 2009, 2010, 2011

Leading jockey (6 wins):
 Freddy Head – Carabella (1967), Prudent Miss (1970), Thorough (1982), Northern Aspen (1985), Navratilovna (1989), Hydro Calido (1992)
 Olivier Peslier – Shaanxi (1996), Goldikova (2008, 2009, 2010, 2011), Amazing Maria (2015)

Leading trainer (5 wins):
 John Cunnington Sr. – Otero (1945), Procureuse (1947), Balle Negre (1948), Action (1968), Princess Arjumand (1973)
 François Mathet – Lilya (1958), Breloque (1960), Tin Top (1961), Tamoure (1965), Kirmiz (1972)
 David Smaga – Thorough (1982), Elle Seule (1986), Navratilovna (1989), Leariva (1991), Miss Berbere (1998)
 André Fabre – Nashmeel (1987), Ski Paradise (1993), Smolensk (1995), Daneskaya (1997), Esoterique (2014)
 Freddy Head – Goldikova (2008, 2009, 2010, 2011), With You (2018)

Leading owner (4 wins):
 Teruya Yoshida – Shaanxi (1996), Lady of Chad (2000), Marbye (2004), Elusive Kate (2012)
 Wertheimer et Frère – Goldikova (2008, 2009, 2010, 2011)

Winners since 1980

Earlier winners

 1929: Tivoli
 1930: Starlight
 1931: Celerina
 1932: Confidence
 1933: Arpette
 1934: Eleda
 1935: Rarity
 1936: Pamina
 1937: Aziyade
 1938: Tonnelle
 1939: Dixiana
 1940: no race
 1941: Thread
 1942: Picture
 1943: Thiorba
 1944: Laelia
 1945: Otero
 1946: Salamis
 1947: Procureuse
 1948: Balle Negre
 1949:
 1950: Fontaine
 1951: Marcalla
 1952:
 1953: Dynastie
 1954:
 1955: Tanina
 1956: Djanet
 1957: Careless Love
 1958: Lilya
 1959: Begrolles
 1960: Breloque
 1961: Tin Top
 1962:
 1963: Mona Louise
 1964: Palinda
 1965: Tamoure
 1966: Cover Girl
 1967: Carabella
 1968: Action
 1969: Zelinda
 1970: Prudent Miss
 1971: Madame's Share
 1972: Kirmiz
 1973: Princess Arjumand
 1974: Gay Style
 1975: Infra Green
 1976: Carolina Moon
 1977: Sanedtki
 1978: Clear Picture
 1979: Topsy

See also
 List of French flat horse races
 Recurring sporting events established in 1929  – this race is included under its original title, Prix d'Astarté.

References

 France Galop / Racing Post:

 france-galop.com – A Brief History: Prix Rothschild.
 galop.courses-france.com – Prix d'Astarté – Palmarès depuis 1983.
 galopp-sieger.de – Prix Rothschild (ex Prix d'Astarté).
 horseracingintfed.com – International Federation of Horseracing Authorities – Prix Rothschild (2018).
 pedigreequery.com – Prix Rothschild – Deauville.

Mile category horse races for fillies and mares
Deauville-La Touques Racecourse
Horse races in France
Recurring sporting events established in 1929
1929 establishments in France